Diamond Castle Holdings is a private equity firm focused on leveraged buyout and growth capital investments in middle-market companies across a range of industries including the media, healthcare, financial services, power and industrial sectors.

The firm, which is based in New York City, was founded in 2004.  The firm has raised approximately $1.9 billion since inception.

History
In 2004, DLJMB co-head Larry Schloss, along with four senior members of DLJ Merchant Banking Partners, led a spinout from Credit Suisse to form a new private equity firm which would come to be known as Diamond Castle Holdings.

Funds
In December 2006, the firm announced it had completed fundraising for a $1.85 billion private equity fund, known as Diamond Castle Partners IV (a reference to the three DLJMB funds previously raised).

As of 2014, the firm had not sought to raise a successor fund.

See also
 DLJ Merchant Banking Partners

References

External links
Diamond Castle Holdings (company website)

Financial services companies established in 2004
Private equity firms of the United States
Investment banking private equity groups
Financial services companies based in New York (state)